Raed Club Arbaâ, known as RC Arbaâ  or simply RCA for short, is an Algerian football club located in Larbaâ. The club was founded in 1941 and its colours are blue and white.  Their home stadium, the Stade Ismaïl Makhlouf, has a capacity of some 5,000 spectators. The club is currently playing in the Algerian Ligue Professionnelle 1.

In 2012, RC Arba finished first in the Groupe Centre of the 2011-12 Ligue Nationale du Football Amateur to win promotion to the Algerian Ligue Professionnelle 2, marking their return to the second division after a twelve-year absence. The following season, they finished second in the 2012-13 Algerian Ligue Professionnelle 2 to win promotion to the Algerian Ligue Professionnelle 1 for the first time.

On July 18, 2021, RC Arbaâ promoted to the Algerian Ligue Professionnelle 1.

Players
Algerian teams are limited to two foreign players. The squad list includes only the principal nationality of each player;

Current squad
As of 5 February 2023.

Personnel

Current technical staff

Managers
 Samir Boudjaarane
 Tahar Chérif El-Ouazzani (2013–2014)
 Mohamed Mekhazni (2014–2014)
 Darko Janackovic (2014–2014)
 Mohamed Mihoubi (2014–2015)
 Billel Dziri (2015–2015)
 Darko Janackovic (2015–)

References

External links 

 
Association football clubs established in 1941
Football clubs in Algeria
Blida Province
Algerian Ligue Professionnelle 1 clubs
1941 establishments in Algeria
Sports clubs in Algeria